Michael Pocock (born 18 December 1945) is a New Zealand cricketer. He played in four first-class matches for Northern Districts in 1965/66.

See also
 List of Northern Districts representative cricketers

References

External links
 

1945 births
Living people
New Zealand cricketers
Northern Districts cricketers
Sportspeople from Te Kūiti
Cricketers from Waikato